Participatory modeling is a purposeful learning process for action that engages the implicit and explicit knowledge of stakeholders to create formalized and shared representation(s) of reality. In this process, the participants co-formulate the problem and use modeling practices to aid in the description, solution, and decision-making actions of the group. Participatory modeling is often used in environmental and resource management contexts. It can be described as engaging non-scientists in the scientific process. The participants structure the problem, describe the system, and create a shared understanding of how the system works. Participatory modeling is often used in natural resources management, such as forests or water.

There are numerous benefits from this type of modeling, including a high degree of ownership and motivation towards change for the people involved in the modeling process. It also helps to develop more acceptable solutions and often creates more consensus among the stakeholders involved.

See also
 Model-driven architecture
 Participatory design
 Participatory GIS
 Public participation GIS
 Problem structuring methods
 Shared vision planning
 SEQUAL framework

References

Scientific modelling
Systems theory